Neja Filipič (born 22 April 1995) is a Slovenian athlete specialising in the long jump and triple jump. She won a bronze medal in the latter at the 2019 Summer Universiade.

International competitions

Personal bests
Outdoor
Long jump – 6.56 (+1.6 m/s, Slovenska Bistrica 2020)
Triple jump – 14.22 (+0.5 m/s, Maribor 2020)
Indoor
Long jump – 6.30 (Belgrade 2017)
Triple jump – 13.49 (Novo Mesto 2020)

References

1995 births
Living people
Slovenian female long jumpers
Slovenian female triple jumpers
Sportspeople from Ljubljana
European Games competitors for Slovenia
Athletes (track and field) at the 2019 European Games
Universiade bronze medalists for Slovenia
Universiade medalists in athletics (track and field)
Medalists at the 2019 Summer Universiade
20th-century Slovenian women
21st-century Slovenian women
Athletes (track and field) at the 2022 Mediterranean Games
Mediterranean Games gold medalists in athletics
Mediterranean Games gold medalists for Slovenia